The 2012 Tour of Utah was the ninth edition of the Tour of Utah.  Once again, the race was included on the UCI America Tour, with a UCI classification of 2.1.  As such, the race is only open to teams on the UCI Pro Tour, UCI Professional Continental and UCI Continental circuits.  The race took place between August 7–12, 2012 as a six-day, six-stage race, with some major differences to the prior editions, such as the elimination of the prologue and the inclusion of a team time trial instead of an individual time trial.   The 2012 Tour of Utah was one of five UCI-ranked stage races in the United States in 2012 and one of three (along with the 2012 Tour of California and the 2012 USA Pro Cycling Challenge, which are both ranked 2.HC) that attracted multiple ProTeams to compete.

Teams

In July, the Tour of Utah announced a 17-team field, made up of six ProTeams (up from five), five UCI Professional Continental teams (up from four) and six UCI Continental teams (down from seven), thus giving the race a total of 17 teams (up from 16).  In total, eight of the 16 teams that competed in 2011 were invited to return to this event, as well as a ProTeam that merged into another ProTeam (RadioShack-Nissan-Trek) and a team that competed in 2010, but did not get a place in 2011 (Bontrager-Livestrong).  EPM–UNE is based in Colombia, and four of the five Professional Continental teams are not US-based, coming from Canada, China, the Netherlands and Germany.

UCI ProTeams
  *
  *
  *
  
 
 

UCI Professional Continental Teams
  *
  *
 
 
 

(* – participated in 2011)

UCI Continental Teams
  *
  *
 Competitive Cyclist Racing Team *
 
 EPM–UNE
 Team Exergy

Contenders 

In addition to all of the last four champions of the race -- (Jeff Louder (UnitedHealthcare), Francisco Mancebo (Competitive Cyclist) and two-time defending champion Levi Leipheimer (Omega Pharma–Quick-Step)) -- the race included potential contenders Tom Danielson (Garmin), Christian Vande Velde (Garmin), David Zabriskie (Garmin) and Chris Horner (RadioShack-Nissan-Trek).  The race was held during the 2012 Summer Olympics, and 11 current or former Olympians competed.  Although each of the 17 teams was permitted to bring up to 8 starters (for a maximum of 136), the race included only 129 starters, because 3 of the ProTour teams (BMC, Omega Pharma–Quick-Step, and Liquigas-Cannondale) brought only 6 and a fourth (Rabobank) brought only 7.

Stages

Stage 1
August 7, 2012 -- Ogden – Ogden, Medium mountain stage, 
For the first time, the Tour of Utah started with a full stage instead of a prologue. Although the route included five categorized climbs, a select peloton of 40 returned to  downtown Ogden with the lead, resulting in a sprint finish. Although the lead pack all finished in the same time, the first three across the finish line and intermediate sprint placers received time bonuses that gave them the lead.

Stage 2 
August 8, 2012 --  Miller Motorsports Park, team time trial, 
Team time in the team time trial was determined by the fifth member of the team to cross the finish line.  The stage was easily won by the  team, pushing American Christian Vande Velde into the overall lead.  Levi Leipheimer's chances to defend his championships probably came to an end on this stage, as his weak  team, which only started with six riders, quickly dropped one rider and then repeatedly had to sit up to avoid dropping a second rider, placing last among the 17 teams and losing over two minutes as a result.

Stage 3 
August 9, 2012 -- Ogden to University of Utah,

Stage 4 
August 10, 2012 -- Lehi – Salt Lake City,

Stage 5 
August 11, 2012 -- Kimball Junction to Snowbird,

Stage 6 
August 12, 2012 -- Park City – Park City,

Overall

Classification leadership

References

2012
2012 in road cycling
2012 in American sports
2012 in sports in Utah
August 2012 sports events in the United States